Villa Road is a street in Lambeth, south London. The row of terraced houses was built in the Victorian era and scheduled to be demolished in the late 1960s as part of a development plan. From 1973 onwards, houses were squatted and an alternative community containing anarchists, British Black Panthers, feminists, Marxists, primal screamers and single mothers. Lambeth Council applied for possession orders for most of the buildings on the street in June 1976 and the squatters built barricades to resist eviction. After prolonged negotiations the council decided to legalize the occupation in 1978, but only after demolishing the southern side of the street. In 2006, the former squatters were profiled in the documentary film "Property is Theft" as part of the BBC series Lefties.

History
In the Victorian era, a two-sided row of terraced houses was built on Villa Road in Angell Town, which was located in the borough of Lambeth in south London. By 1967, Lambeth Council had decided to demolish 400 houses in Angell Town and build new tower blocks as part of the Brixton Plan. Brixton Road, which ran perpendicular to the west end of Villa Road, would be converted into a six lane highway for traffic entering and leaving London. Local people opposed the plans and formed community groups, such as the Villa Road Street Group.

Squatted
At the beginning of 1973, the Villa Road Street Group squatted number 20. Over the next year, more houses were occupied, leading to condemnation from the council, which decided to demolish the street. At the close of 1974, 15 houses on Villa Road were squatted as well as 
315 Brixton Road, where Villa and Brixton roads met. The latter was evicted in April 1975 and it was immediately demolished, alongside two other houses which had not been squatted since they were in such bad condition. The council said it had cleared the space to build a footbridge over Brixton Road to connect the park planned beside Villa Road to the new Stockwell Park Estate, but then dropped the plans, causing anger locally that the building had been destroyed for no reason. In the summer of 1975, the 100 squatters organised a street carnival; at Villa Road, there was a cafe and a food co-operative, and a regular news-sheet called The Villain was published.

By this time almost the entire street was squatted in opposition to council's plans to redevelop the area, according to which 21 of the 32 houses on Villa Road must be demolished. The buildings were on both sides of the street and were lived in 200 people including anarchists, British Black Panthers, feminists, Marxists (at number 31), primal screamers (at 12) and single mothers. Pete Cooper lived at number 31 to begin with and Christian Wolmar lived at 27, with six other people. An alternative community formed as it had at other squatted locations in London such as Huntley Street, St Agnes Place and Tolmers Square.

The council applied for possession orders for most of the buildings on the street in June 1976; at court, eight out of 15 orders were granted. The street prepared to contest the evictions, building barricades and publicising its struggle. In October, the council offered to legalise 17 of the houses and despite the difficulties of maintaining barricades for months, the street group refused because the houses were in such a bad state. In January 1977, the council went to the High Court, hoping to gain possession orders for the entire street. The judge suggested the two sides negotiate an agreement and set the eviction date for June 1977 in three months' time.

The council decided to legalize the occupation in 1978, but only after demolishing the southern side of the street, leaving the northern side. The barricades came down in March 1978 and many of the remaining buildings subsequently joined together into a housing association. The council remained and Solon Housing Association renovated 20 houses. In the 2010s, Lambeth Council decided to sell off its housing stock and by 2017 there were no housing association homes on Villa Road.

In popular culture
Vanessa Engle made "Property is Theft" as part of the series Lefties in 2006. She interviewed former inhabitants of the squats such as Cooper and Piers Corbyn.

In The Long Good Friday, three gangsters go to 33 Villa Road to accost a grass.

References

Further reading
 

Streets in the London Borough of Lambeth
Brixton
Squats in the United Kingdom
Anarchism in the United Kingdom
Victorian architecture in England